Heinrich X, Count of Reuss-Ebersdorf (29 November 1662 in Bad Lobenstein – 10 June 1711 in Ebersdorf), was a member of the House of Reuss (younger line).  He was Count of Lobenstein, and from 1678, Count of Ebersdorf.  He was the founder of Reuss-Ebersdorf line.

Life 
Henry was the youngest son of Henry X, Count of Reuss-Lobenstein (1621–1671), Lord of Lobenstein, Hirschberg and Ebersdorf and his wife Marie Sibylle of Reuss-Obergreiz.  His paternal grandfather was Henry II, Count of Reuss-Gera.  When the county was divided in 1678, Henry X was assigned as his residence the village of Ebersdorf, which was unusual, since it was a village.  Before he married, he had the existing manor house expanded to a modest castle between 1692 and 1694, and added a Baroque garden.

When his castle was ready, Henry X finally married, on 29 November 1694, in Laubach with Erdmuthe Benigna (1670–1732), daughter of Count Johann Frederick of Solms-Laubach (1625–1696) and his wife Baroness Benigna of Promnitz-Sorau (1648-1702).  Both spouses were seen as extremely pious.  They were close friends of the Pietist-pedagogue August Hermann Francke from Halle, and later with the Count Nikolaus Ludwig of Zinzendorf, who would marry their daughter Erdmuthe Dorothea.  Ebersdorf soon became a center of the Pietism in Thuringia.

Issue 
Count Henry X had the following children:
 Benigna Marie (1695-1751)
 Friederike Wilhelmine (1696-1698)
 Charlotte Louise (1698-1698)
 Heinrich XXIX (1699-1747), Count of Reuss-Ebersdorf, married in 1721 Countess Sophie Theodora of Castell-Remlingen (1703-1777)
 Erdmuthe Dorothea (1700-1756), married in 1722 with Count Nicholas Ludwig of Zinzendorf (1700-1760)
 Bibiane Henriette (1702-1745), married in 1741 with Baron George Adolph Marschall of Bieberstein
 Sophie Albertine Dorothea (1703-1708)
 Ernestine Eleanor (1706-1766)

References 
 Thomas Gehrlein: "Das Haus Reuss: Älterer und Jüngerer Linie", booklet, August 2006

Counts of Reuss
House of Reuss
1662 births
1711 deaths
17th-century German people